Arthur Young ( 1906) was a Scottish footballer. His regular position was as an outside right. He played for Hurlford Thistle and Manchester United. He made his Football League debut on 27 October 1906, when he played in a 2–1 home win Birmingham.

External links
Profile at StretfordEnd.co.uk
Profile at MUFCInfo.com

Scottish footballers
Association football forwards
Manchester United F.C. players
Year of birth missing
Year of death missing